The 2011 PBZ Zagreb Indoors was an ATP tennis tournament played on hard courts indoors. It was the 6th edition of the PBZ Zagreb Indoors, and was part of the ATP World Tour 250 series of the 2011 ATP World Tour. It took place in Zagreb, Croatia from January 30 through February 6, 2011.

ATP entrants

Seeds

 Rankings are as of January 17, 2011

Other entrants
The following players received wildcards into the singles main draw:
  Nikola Mektić
  Franko Škugor
  Antonio Veić

The following players received entry from the qualifying draw:

  Alex Bogomolov Jr.
  Blaž Kavčič
  Stefan Koubek
  Dušan Lajović

Champions

Singles

 Ivan Dodig def.  Michael Berrer, 6–3, 6–4
It was Dodig's first career title.

Doubles

 Dick Norman /  Horia Tecău def.  Marcel Granollers /  Marc López, 6–3, 6–4

External links
ATP Tournament Profile
Official website

2011
PBZ Zagreb Indoors
PBZ Zagreb Indoors
2010s in Zagreb
Sports competitions in Zagreb
January 2011 sports events in Europe
February 2011 sports events in Europe